Aguano is the extinct language of the Aguano people of Peru. Loukotka (1968) identified it with Chamicuro, but Chamicuro speakers say that the Aguano people spoke Quechua (Wise 1987).

Names and varieties
Alternate spellings are Uguano, Aguanu, Awano; it has also been called Santa Crucino.

Mason (1950) listed three Aguano groups, Aguano proper (including Seculusepa/Chilicawa and Melikine/Tivilo), Cutinana, and Maparina. Schematically, these can be summarized as:

Aguano proper
Seculusepa (Chilicawa)
Melikine (Tivilo)
Cutinana
Maparina

References

External link
OLAC resources in and about the Aguano language

Indigenous languages of South America
Unattested languages of South America
Extinct languages of South America